Petro Ivanovych Kushlyk (born 22 March 1951) is a former Soviet football defender and a Ukrainian coach.

References
 

1951 births
Living people
People from Kalush, Ukraine
Soviet footballers
FC Spartak Ivano-Frankivsk players
Ukrainian footballers
Association football defenders
Soviet football managers
Ukrainian football managers
Ukrainian Premier League managers
FC Beskyd Nadvirna managers
Avia Świdnik managers
Widzew Łódź managers
FC Hoverla Uzhhorod managers
FC Prykarpattia Ivano-Frankivsk (2004) managers
Ukrainian expatriate football managers
Expatriate football managers in Poland
Expatriate football managers in Lithuania
Ukrainian expatriate sportspeople in Poland
Ukrainian expatriate sportspeople in Lithuania
Sportspeople from Ivano-Frankivsk Oblast